Gaming industry, game industry, or games industry may refer to:

 Gambling industry
 Especially in reference to casinos
 Online gambling industry
 Video game industry
 Industry related to games, generically
 GamesIndustry, subsidiary of Eurogamer

See also 
 Gaming